Vasates is a genus of mites in the family Eriophyidae, which cause galls on the leaves of trees, including the following species: 
Vasates aceriscrumena (Riley & Vasey, 1870)
Vasates quadripedes (Shimer, 1869)

References

Eriophyidae
Trombidiformes genera
Taxa named by Henry Shimer